Vologases I of Armenia or Vagharsh I was a Parthian prince who ruled Armenia from 117 to 140. He was apparently an Arsacid and is described as the "son of Sanatruces" (King of Armenia 88–110) by Cassius Dio. He became king following the end of the brief Roman annexation of Armenia. He is known to have founded the city of Vagharshapat, which served as the capital of Armenia from 120 to 330, and a number of other settlements that bear his name. Although Armenia prospered during his reign, he was forced to appeal to Rome for assistance against an Iberian invasion towards the end of his rule. According to Movses Khorenatsi, he may have died in battle against the invaders. After his death, the Romans made Sohaemeus the ruler of Armenia.

References

Sources 
 
 
 

2nd-century kings of Armenia
Arsacid kings of Armenia
2nd-century Iranian people